This is an alphabetical list of settlements in Bhutan. 
 For a list of the main cities and towns see List of cities in Bhutan.
 For a list of government-designated municipalities, see Thromde.
 For a list of villages, see List of villages in Bhutan.

List of settlements in Bhutan

Ama
Bachap
Balfai
Bali
Barshong
Beteni
Bhangbarai
Bhurgaon
Bitana
Bjoka
Bondey
Bumtang Tang
Buri Chu
Byakar Dzong
Byaradingka
Chalaika
Chamarchi
Changra
Chendebji
Chhukha Dzong
Chilo
Chungkar
Chuyul
Daga
Dam
Damphu
Daphu
Denchukha
Dhaje
Dhur
Diptsang
Dogsar
Domka
Donkar
Doring
Doronagaon
Dotanang
Dramitse
Duna Dzong
Dzongsa Dzong
Galechugaon
Gasila
Ghunkarah
Gnimthenla
Gomtu
Gongchuandgaon
Gyetsa
Ha
Harachu
Hatisar
Hlari
Jigme Dorji
Kagha
Kamganka
Kangpar
Kechungka
Kencho
Kengkhar
Khar
Khitokha
Khotokha Valley
Kisona
Kungtar
Lamedada
Lamti
Lao
Lhedang
Lhuntse
Lobnig
Louri
Lung Chen
Manikyangsa
Maogaon
Mochhu
Momai Thang
Mongar
Monka
Nab Chöte
Nabji
Naitola
Naktsang
Namtir
Naspe
Ngalangkang
Niche Kalikhola
Nimgong
Ningsang La
Oola (formerly Alla)
Pachu
Pajo
Paro
Paro Airport
Paten
Phisugaon
Phuntsholing
Pieksao
Pimi
Pinsoperi
Phobjikha Valley
Punakha
Rading
Raga
Rapley
Rife
Ritang
Rungzyung
Saidu
Sakteng
Samdrup Choling
Samtengang
Sana
Samtse
Sangkari
Sarpang
Sasoka
Sassi
Sawang
Sawaphu
Sengor
Shabling
Shaley
Shali
Shamgong Dzong
Shapang
Sharithang
Shingbe
Shingkarap
Shinka
Shiuji
Shodug
Shongar Dzong
Shuri
Singye Dzong
Suchha
Sufali
Sunphan
Tala
Tamji
Tangsebi
Taripe
Tashichho Dzong
Tashtanje
Tendu
Thebong
Thimphu
Thode
Thrimshing
Thumgaon
Thunkar
Tima
Tobrang
Tongla Kenga
Tormoshangsa
Tosumani
Trashigang
Trashiyangtse
Trongsa Dzong
Tsangka
Tshalunang
Tse Kang
Tungka La
Ura
Usak
Wangchukling
Wangdue Phodrang
Yalang
Yuwak
Zhemgang

Notes and references

External links

 
Cities